1141 Bohmia, provisional designation , is a Florian asteroid from the inner regions of the asteroid belt, approximately 6 kilometers in diameter. It was discovered by German astronomer Max Wolf at the Heidelberg-Königstuhl State Observatory on 4 January 1930. The asteroid was named after German philanthropist Katharina Bohm-Waltz.

Orbit and classification 

Bohmia is a member of the Flora family, a giant asteroid family and the largest family of stony asteroids in the main-belt. It orbits the Sun in the inner asteroid belt at a distance of 1.9–2.6 AU once every 3 years and 5 months (1,249 days; semi-major axis 2.27 AU). Its orbit has an eccentricity of 0.17 and an inclination of 4° with respect to the ecliptic. The body's observation arc begins with its official discovery observation at Heidelberg in January 1930.

Physical characteristics 

Bohmias spectral type is unknown. However, its albedo is similar to that of the Flora family's parent body, 8 Flora, which is a stony S-type asteroid.

Diameter and albedo 

According to the survey carried out by the NEOWISE mission of NASA's Wide-field Infrared Survey Explorer, Bohmia measures 5.642 kilometers in diameter and its surface has an albedo of 0.251.

Rotation period 

No rotational lightcurve of Bohmia has been obtained from photometric observations. The asteroid's rotation period, poles and shape remain unknown.

Naming 

This minor planet was named after Katharina Bohm-Waltz (died 1901), a German philanthropist who donated a 0.72-meter reflecting telescope (named Waltz reflector) to the discovering Heidelberg Observatory. The official naming citation was mentioned in The Names of the Minor Planets by Paul Herget in 1955.

References

External links 
 Asteroid Lightcurve Database (LCDB), query form (info )
 Dictionary of Minor Planet Names, Google books
 Asteroids and comets rotation curves, CdR – Observatoire de Genève, Raoul Behrend
 Discovery Circumstances: Numbered Minor Planets (1)-(5000) – Minor Planet Center
 
 

001141
Discoveries by Max Wolf
Named minor planets
19300104